The Bosna is the third longest river in Bosnia and Herzegovina, and is considered one of the country's three major internal rivers, along with the Neretva and the Vrbas. The other three major rivers of Bosnia and Herzegovina are the Una, to the northwest; the Sava, to the north, and the Drina, to the east. This river is the namesake of Bosnia.

The river is possibly mentioned for the first time during the 1st century AD by Roman historian Marcus Velleius Paterculus under the name Bathinus flumen. Another basic source that is associated with the hydronym Bathinus is the Salonitan inscription of the governor of Dalmatia, Publius Cornelius Dolabella, where it is said that the Bathinum river divides the Breuci from the Osseriates. 
And also by the name of Basante. According to philologist Anton Mayer the name Bosna could be derived from Illyrian Bass-an-as(-ā) which would be a diversion of the Proto-Indo-European root bʰegʷ, meaning "the running water".

Course and tributaries
The Bosna River has created the Bosna River Valley. This has been developed as the country's industrial center and is home to close to a million people, who live primarily in several major cities. The river's biggest tributaries are the Željeznica, Miljacka, Fojnička, Lašva, Gostović, Krivaja, Usora, and Spreča rivers.

Its source is at the spring Vrelo Bosne, at the foothills of the Mount Igman, on the outskirts of Sarajevo, capital of Bosnia and Herzegovina.  The spring is one of Bosnia and Herzegovina's chief natural landmarks and tourist attractions. From there, the Bosna flows northwards, through the heart of Bosnia, eventually becoming a right tributary of the Sava River in Bosanski Šamac. 

The Bosna flows through a number of cantons. From its starting point in the Sarajevo Canton, it flows through Zenica-Doboj Canton, Doboj Region, and Posavina Canton, in that order. On its way north the River Bosna also passes through the cities of Visoko, Zenica, Maglaj, Doboj, Modriča and Bosanski Šamac.

References

Rivers of Bosnia and Herzegovina